A maritime emergency is usually any serious distress to a maritime vessel or her crew.

See also
 Coast guard
 Emergency Position-Indicating Radio Beacon (EPIRB)
 Flare gun
 Global Maritime Distress Safety System
 Lifeboat
 Mayday (distress signal)

Rescue
Water transport